Annelise Damm Olesen (born 2 January 1942) is a Danish middle-distance runner. She competed in the 800 metres at the 1968 Summer Olympics and the 1972 Summer Olympics.

References

1942 births
Living people
Athletes (track and field) at the 1968 Summer Olympics
Athletes (track and field) at the 1972 Summer Olympics
Danish female middle-distance runners
Olympic athletes of Denmark
Place of birth missing (living people)